The Fitzsimmons Nunataks are a group of small nunataks about  east-northeast of Welcome Mountain of the Outback Nunataks and  southeast of the Helliwell Hills, Victoria Land, Antarctica. They were mapped by the United States Geological Survey from surveys and U.S. Navy air photos, 1959–64, and were named by the Advisory Committee on Antarctic Names for John M. Fitzsimmons, a biologist at McMurdo Station, Hut Point Peninsula, Ross Island, 1965–66. This geographical feature lies situated on the Pennell Coast, a portion of Antarctica lying between Cape Williams and Cape Adare.

References 

Nunataks of Victoria Land
Pennell Coast